Eucalyptus dolichorhyncha, commonly known as the fuchsia gum, is a species of mallet that is endemic to the south-west of Western Australia. It has smooth, pale grey over pale brown bark, lance-shaped to oblong adult leaves, pendulous, solitary, red flower buds in leaf axils, yellow flowers and winged fruit that is square in cross-section.

Description
Eucalyptus dolichorhyncha is a mallet that typically grows to a height of  but does not form a lignotuber. It has smooth, pale grey over pale orange to pale brown bark. Flowering occurs between January and May and the flowers are yellow.

Taxonomy and naming
Fuchsia gum was first formally described in 1973 by Ian Brooker who gave it the name Eucalyptus forrestiana subsp. dolichorhyncha and published the description in the Journal of the Royal Society of Western Australia. The type specimen was collected by John W. Green near Grass Patch in 1957. In 1993, Brooker and Hopper raised the subspecies to species status as E. dolichorhyncha. The specific epithet (dolichorhyncha) is derived from the Ancient Greek words dolichos meaning "long" and rhynchos meaning "snout" or "muzzle", referring to the long narrow operculum.

Distribution and habitat
Eucalyptus dolichorhyncha has a limited range on flats in a small area along the south coast of the Goldfields-Esperance region of Western Australia north of Esperance where it grows in sandy clay or clay soils.

Conservation status
This mallet is classified as "Priority Four" by the Government of Western Australia Department of Parks and Wildlife, meaning that is rare or near threatened.

See also
List of Eucalyptus species

References

dolichorhyncha
Endemic flora of Western Australia
Myrtales of Australia
Vulnerable flora of Australia
Plants described in 1973
Taxa named by Ian Brooker
Taxa named by Stephen Hopper